Gariep Dam, founded as "Oranjekrag", is a settlement in Xhariep District Municipality in the Free State (province) of South Africa.

Gariep Dam is a town on the northern bank of the Orange River, 50 km west of Bethulie and 48 km north-east of Colesberg. It was laid out in 1965-66 to accommodate the builders of the dam. The previous name is Afrikaans and means "Orange (River) power". The town acquired its current name in 1996.

References

Populated places in the Kopanong Local Municipality
Populated places established in 1965